The memorial complex of Chor-Bakr was built over the burial place of Abu-Bakr-Said, who died in the year 360 of the Muslim Calendar (970-971 AD), and who was one of the four of Abu-Bakrs (Chor-Bakr) - descendants of Muhammad. The complex includes the necropolis of family tombs, and courtyards enclosed with walls. It is located in modern-day  Kalaya, Uzbekistan.

History
This site was built during the era of Uzbek leader Muhammad Shaybani (r.1500–1510) at the purported burial site of Abu Bakr Said and his son Abu Bakr Ahmad. The site became a popular location for ceremonies and prayers in the 16th century. However, it started to lose importance in the 19th century and eventually became forbidden as a religious site during the Soviet era. After the end of the Soviet era in Uzbekistan, the site increased in importance for Muslim pilgrimage and is considered necessary for Muslim Uzbeks, along with Shahi Zinda, before their pilgrimage to Mecca.

Site Description
Many constructions in the complex have richly decorated polychromatic tiles.

In many courtyards above burial places, marble gravestones with epigraphic inscriptions, and vegetative and geometrical ornaments, are installed.

The structure of the complex includes 25 constructions - khonaqo, mosque, ayvan with khudjras, darvazahana, minaret, and 20 small objects - courtyards - burial places with the dome coverings, and separately standing portals. The territory occupies both a memorial and an ancient cemetery equal to 3 hectares.

World Heritage Status
This site was added to the UNESCO World Heritage Tentative List on 18 January 2008, in the Cultural category.

References

External links
 Chor-Bakr Necropolis, Bukhara at Advantour.com

Central Asia
Mausoleums in Uzbekistan
Uzbekistani culture
World Heritage Tentative List
Bukhara